Lyndon B. Johnson State Park and Historic Site is a state park located along the Pedernales River in Gillespie County, Texas, United States west of Johnson City and east of Fredericksburg. The state created the park with donated land to honor Lyndon B. Johnson as a "national and world leader." The park opened to the public in 1970.

History
Friends of Johnson raised the money to buy the land across the Pedernales River from Johnson's Ranch (now part of the Lyndon B. Johnson National Historical Park) for the park and donated the land to the State of Texas in 1965. The master plan for the park was developed by Austin-area architect J. Roy White, a personal friend of the Johnson family who had worked extensively on the Johnson Ranch; White also designed the park's visitor center. The  facility was officially dedicated in August, 1970, in a ceremony attended by the Johnson family and a host of dignitaries. One of the trustees was Johnson's close friend and political advisor, former state Attorney General John Ben Shepperd.

Features
The park has a large visitor center complex with interpretive center about Johnson's life. Tours of the LBJ Ranch are by permit only and are by self-guided auto tour departing from the state park's visitor center.

The park offers recreational facilities for swimming, tennis and baseball. Fishing is allowed in the Pedernales River and there is a nature trail for hiking. The park maintains small herds of Texas Longhorn cattle, American Bison and White-tailed Deer.

Sauer-Beckmann Farmstead

The Sauer-Beckmann Farmstead is a living history farm that presents rural Texas life as it was around 1918. The park employees wear period clothing and perform the daily routine of life using period tools and techniques. The farm was settled by John Sauer and his family in the late 19th century and then by Herman Beckmann and his sons in the early 20th century.

See also
 List of Texas state parks
 Presidential memorials in the United States

References

Parent, Laurence. The Official Guide to Texas State Parks. University of Texas Press, Austin. Fourth printing, 2005. pp 90–91.

External links

 Texas Parks and Wildlife: Lyndon B. Johnson State Park & Historic Site
 Lyndon B. Johnson State Park and Historic Site in Google Cultural Institute
Lyndon B. Johnson State Park in Exploring the Texas State Park System on the Texas Archive of the Moving Image

State parks of Texas
Protected areas of Gillespie County, Texas
Museums in Gillespie County, Texas
Living museums in Texas
Farm museums in Texas
Presidential museums in Texas
Protected areas established in 1970
1970 establishments in Texas